Special Edition is an album by drummer and pianist Jack DeJohnette featuring tenor saxophonist David Murray, alto saxophonist Arthur Blythe and bassist and cellist Slip Warren recorded in 1979 released on the ECM label in 1980. The AllMusic review by Scott Yanow states, "The first (and mightiest) of Jack DeJohnette's Special Edition ensembles offered a sound that in many ways was revolutionary in modern contemporary and creative improvised music circa 1980... This CD deserves a definitive five-star rating for the lofty place it commands in the evolution of jazz headed toward new heights and horizons". A JazzTimes reviewer selected it in 2012 as one of DeJohnette's key albums.

Track listing 
All compositions by Jack DeJohnette except as indicated
 "One for Eric" - 9:52
 "Zoot Suite" - 11:29
 "Central Park West" (John Coltrane) - 3:16
 "India" (Coltrane) - 6:02
 "Journey to the Twin Planet" - 8:42 
Recorded at Generation Sound Studios, New York in March, 1979

Personnel 
 Jack DeJohnette – drums, piano, melodica
 David Murray – tenor saxophone, bass clarinet
 Arthur Blythe – alto saxophone
 Peter "Slip" Warren – bass, cello

References 

Jack DeJohnette albums
1980 albums
ECM Records albums